Holy Cross High School is a high school serving grades 9 to 12, located in south-eastern Saskatoon, Saskatchewan. It is part of Greater Saskatoon Catholic Schools.

Currently its feeder schools are Bishop Pocock School, Georges Vanier Catholic Fine Arts School, Pope John Paul II School, St. Bernard School, St. Frances School, St. Luke School, École St. Matthew School and St. Philip School.

Sports

Notable alumni
 Jeff Adamson – co-founder of food delivery app, SkipTheDishes.com
 Mike Babcock – former NHL head coach, now head coach for University of Saskatchewan Huskies men's hockey
 Dan Farthing – Saskatchewan Roughriders 1991–2007
 Darcy Kuemper – NHL goaltender for the Colorado Avalanche
 Catriona Le May Doan – Olympic gold medalist in speed skating
 Curtis Leschyshyn – former NHL defenceman
 Earl Pereira – singer and musician of Wide Mouth Mason
 Theresa Sokyrka – singer and musician
The school contains a Wall of Honour which showcases many distinguished alumni.

References

External links

 

High schools in Saskatoon
Catholic secondary schools in Saskatchewan
Educational institutions established in 1963
1963 establishments in Saskatchewan